Radio was introduced in Canada in the late 1890s, although initially transmissions were limited to the dot-and-dashes of Morse code, and primarily used for point-to-point services, especially for maritime communication. The history of broadcasting in Canada dates to the early 1920s, as part of the worldwide development of radio stations sending information and entertainment programming to the general public. Television was introduced in the 1950s, and soon became the primary broadcasting service.

History

Major themes in Canadian broadcasting history include:
 development of the engineering technology
 construction of stations and the building of networks
 widespread purchase and use of radio and television sets by the public
 debates regarding state versus private ownership of stations
 financing of the broadcast media through the government, licence fees, and advertising
 changing programming content, including concerns about American "cultural imperialism" via the airwaves, and its impact on Canadian identity
 media's influence on shaping audience responses to music, sports and politics
 role of the Québec government and Francophone versus Anglophone cultural tastes and the role of other ethnic groups and First Nations
 impact of the Internet and smartphones on traditional broadcasting media.

Early radio development

From the late 1890s until 1913 there were few regulations covering radio communication in Canada. The earliest stations were only capable of transmitting Morse code; despite this limitation as early as May 1907 the Marconi station at Camperdown, Nova Scotia began broadcasting time signals on a regular schedule.

The Radiotelegraph Act of June 6, 1913 established general Canadian policies for radio communication, then commonly known as "wireless telegraphy". Similar to the law in force in Britain, this act required that operation of "any radiotelegraph apparatus" required a licence, issued by the Minister of the Naval Service. This included members of the general public who only possessed a radio receiver and were not making transmissions, who were required to hold an "Amateur Experimental Station" licence, as well as pass the exam needed to receive an "Amateur Experimental Certificate of Proficiency", which required the ability to send and receive Morse code at five words a minute. (This policy contrasted with the United States, which only required licenses for operating transmitters, and had no restrictions or taxes on individuals only using receivers).

With its entrance into World War I in August 1914, Canada generally banned the civilian use of radio receivers and transmitters. This restriction remained in force until 1 May 1919. Radio regulation remained under the oversight of the Department of Naval Service until July 1, 1922, when it was transferred to civilian control under the Department of Marine and Fisheries. 

During World War I, advances in vacuum tube technology made audio transmissions practical. There was no formal category of radio stations providing entertainment broadcasts intended for the general public until April 1922, so the earliest Canadian stations making broadcasts operated under a mixture of Experimental, Amateur, and governmental authorizations.

Information about the earliest experimental broadcasts is limited. One pioneer was William Walter Westover Grant, who served in the British Royal Air in France during World War I, where he gained extensive experience installing and maintaining radio equipment. After the war ended, he returned to Canada where reportedly in May 1919 he "constructed a small station in Halifax, Nova Scotia, over which voice and music were broadcast in probably the first scheduled programs in Canada". In 1920 Grant began working for the Canadian Air Board's Forestry patrol, developing air-to-ground communication for the spotter aircraft used to report forest fires, initially using radiotelegraphy. The original base was located at Morley, Alberta, where Grant constructed station CYAA. In January 1921 operations moved to the High River Air Station in southern Alberta, where Grant established station VAW, which was capable of audio transmissions. In addition to the forestry work Grant began making a series of experimental entertainment broadcasts,  believed to be the first in western Canada. Grant left the forestry project and established the W. W. Grant Radio, Ltd. in Calgary, which on May 18, 1922 was issued the city's third commercial broadcasting station license, with the randomly assigned call letters CFCN (now CKMX).

A better known example was a Montreal station, which was first licensed sometime between April 1, 1914 and March 31, 1915 as experimental station XWA to the Marconi Wireless Telegraph Company of Canada, Ltd. ("Canadian Marconi"), and was one of the few civilian stations allowed to continue operating during World War I, when it was used to conduct military research. At first it only transmitted Morse code, however during the spring of 1919 employee Arthur Runciman began a series of voice tests, although initially the equipment was promoted as being useful for point-to-point communication rather than broadcasting. In early 1919, parent company British Marconi shipped a surplus 500-watt transmitter to Montreal for evaluation. As was common at a number of early stations, the engineers soon tired of having to repetitively speak for the test transmissions, and began to play phonograph records, which drew the attention of local amateur radio operators. The first documented broadcast of entertainment by XWA to a general audience occurred on the evening of May 20, 1920, when a concert was prepared for a Royal Society of Canada audience listening 110 miles (175 kilometers) away at the Château Laurier in the capital city of Ottawa. XWA eventually began operating on a regular schedule, at first run almost single-handedly by Douglas "Darby" Coats. Sometime in 1921 the station's call sign was changed to "9AM", reflecting a policy change in the call signs issued to experimental stations, and a short notice in the November 1921 issue of QST magazine reported that it was now broadcasting once a week on Tuesdays starting at 8 p.m. In April 1922, the station received a commercial broadcasting station license with the randomly assigned call letters of CFCF, and it later adopted the slogan of "Canada's First". This station was deleted, as CINW, in 2010.

In addition to the developing experimental broadcasts taking place in Canada, some American stations, especially at night, could easily be received in the heavily populated parts of Canada.

Formal establishment of broadcasting service

In January 1922 the government lowered the barrier for individuals merely interested in receiving broadcasts, by introducing a new licence category, Private Receiving Station, that removed the need to qualify for an amateur radio licence. The receiving station licences initially cost $1 and had to be renewed yearly. They were issued by the Department of Marine and Fisheries in Ottawa, by Departmental Radio Inspectors, and by postmasters located in the larger towns and cities, with licence periods coinciding with the April 1-March 31 fiscal year. As of March 31, 1923 there was a total of 9,996 Private Receiving Station licenses. The licence fee eventually rose to $2.50 per year to provide revenue for both radio and television broadcasts by the Canadian Broadcasting Corporation, however, it was eliminated effective April 1, 1953. 

In 1922 two new transmitting categories were added to the regulations: "Private Commercial Broadcasting station" and "Amateur Broadcasting station". The annual licence fees for these stations were set on June 30, 1922 at $50 for commercial broadcasting stations, and $5 for amateur. As of March 31, 1923 there were 57 commercial, and 8 amateur, authorized broadcasting stations.

In late April 1922 an initial group of twenty-three commercial broadcasting station licences was announced, which received four-letter call signs starting with "CF", "CH", "CJ" or "CK", plus one additional "C" as the third or fourth letter. These stations were assigned to a band of six wavelengths running in 10-meter steps from 400 to 450 meters (750-667 kHz). Commercial broadcasting stations initially operated under the restriction that "No tolls shall be levied or collected on account of any service performed by this class of station." By 1924 this provision was loosened to allow "the rental of broadcasting stations for advertising purposes" after procuring "the consent of the Minister [of Marine and Fisheries] in writing". However, "direct advertising" was prohibited between the hours of 6.30 p.m. and 11 p.m. ("Direct advertising" was generally defined as conventional advertising messages, in contrast to "indirect advertising", which consisted of more general sponsorship announcements).

Amateur broadcasting stations were issued alphanumeric call signs starting with the number "10", and initially were assigned to transmit on 250 meters (1200 kHz). These stations were licensed to individual amateur associations, and were prohibited from carrying advertising. Most were expected to be established in communities which didn't have a commercial station. Only a small number of Amateur Broadcasting stations would be authorized, and most were eventually converted to commercial operations. (Canada's establishment of an amateur broadcasting station classification was in sharp contrast to the United States, where, beginning in early 1922, amateur stations were explicitly prohibited from making broadcasts intended for the general public.) As of the fall of 1925, there were 11 Canadian amateur broadcasting stations.

At first station audiences consisted largely of young men tinkering with crystal sets, which required the use of earphones so only one person at a time could listen. In 1925 Edward Rogers invented a radio tube using Alternating Current (AC) electricity that immediately became a worldwide standard for much more powerful and easier-to-use radios. He set up the Rogers Majestic company to manufacture receivers and established several broadcasting stations, including experimental station 9RB (later CFRB, Toronto). By the late 1920s easy to use radio sets using loudspeakers were widely available, although somewhat expensive, which opened up a much broader audience, attracting the middle class who could afford them, and also restaurants clubs and taverns, who wanted to attract customers. Even remote towns and localities could listen. Play-by-play sports coverage, especially of ice hockey, absorbed fans more thoroughly than newspaper accounts ever could, and rural areas were especially influenced by sports coverage.

Radio signals on the AM band travel great distances at night, and Canada soon found it had few open frequencies due to the existence of its much larger American neighbor. A major reallocation of U.S. stations on November 11, 1928 informally set aside six frequencies for exclusive Canadian use, but the country complained this was insufficient. In 1941, implementation of the North American Regional Broadcasting Agreement gave Canada some additional exclusive assignments, and the development of the FM band eventually eased the restrictions on the number of available broadcasting slots.

Canadian National Railway Radio: 1923–33

The Canadian National Railway Company (CNR) became interested in radio broadcasting in 1923, due in large part to the leadership of its president, Sir Henry Thornton. That year it began equipping its trains with radio receivers to allow passengers to hear radio broadcasts. In 1924, CNR began building its own stations, and by 1928 it had created Canada's first national network, CNR Radio (officially the Canadian National Railways Radio Department), developed, owned and operated by CNR to provide en route entertainment and information for its passengers.  As broadcasts could be received by anyone living in the coverage area of station transmitters, the network provided radio programming to Canadians from the Pacific coast at Vancouver to the Atlantic coast at Halifax.

During its nine-year existence, CNR Radio provided music, sports, information and drama programming to Canadians. Programs were produced in English, French and occasionally in some First Nations languages, and distributed nationwide through the railway's own telegraph lines and through rented airtime on private radio stations. However, political and competitive pressure forced CNR Radio to close, with many of its assets and personnel migrating to a new government-operated agency, the Canadian Radio Broadcasting Commission (CRBC).

Rival Canadian Pacific Railway (CPR) had applied for licences in January 1930 to compete with the CNR Radio service, but the onset of the Great Depression meant that CPR did not end up pursuing these applications, but instead operated a phantom station in Toronto known as "CPRY"; the call letters standing for "Canadian Pacific Royal York" While a network of affiliates carried the CPR radio network's broadcasts in the first half of the 1930s, the takeover of CNR's Radio service by the CRBC  removed CPR's need to have a network for competitive reasons, and it was discontinued in 1935.

The Aird Commission

A number of problems arose during the 1920s, causing debates on how broadcasting should be managed. These problems included the feeling that religious radio stations had "...emerged as a new weapon with which one religious group could bludgeon another...", and that U.S. stations unfairly dominated the airwaves despite an agreements to reserve some frequencies exclusively for Canadian stations.

In December 1928, P.J. Arthur (Minister of Marine and Fisheries) founded the "Aird Commission", officially the Royal Commission on Radio Broadcasting, to investigate options and the perceived American radio threat. Sir John Aird, Charles A. Bowman and Augustine Frigon were members of this commission. The Aird Report recommended the creation of a public broadcasting system.

Public broadcasting
The 1930 election of a Conservative government, led by R.B. Bennett, made the future of the Aird Commission's recommendations favouring public broadcasting uncertain, and the Canadian Radio League was formed to lobby for their implementation. It influenced public opinion in support of public broadcasting by making the case to trade unions, farm groups, business associations, churches, the Royal Canadian Legion, the Canadian Club of Toronto, newspapers, university presidents and other influential public figures.

In 1932 a public broadcasting body, the Canadian Radio Broadcasting Commission (CRBC), was formed. At its creation, Bennett spoke of the need for public control of radio saying:
 "This country must be assured of complete Canadian control of broadcasting from Canadian sources. Without such control, broadcasting can never be the agency by which national consciousness may be fostered and sustained and national unity still further strengthened."

However the commission had severe internal political troubles, and was replaced in 1936 by the Canadian Broadcasting Corporation (CBC). The CBC was controlled by the national government, and funded largely by taxes (licence fees) collected from radio sets owners. The CBC took over the regulatory role of the Radio Branch, and focused most of its attention on providing programming for a national network. However, private stations continued to exist, which were allowed to rebroadcast CBC programs.

French-language services
In 1945, The Canadian Press (CP) established a French-language radio news service through its subsidiary Broadcast News, the first such wire service for French broadcasters in North America.

The CBC set up a French-language network in Quebec and adjacent Francophone areas. Although the French-language service had little competition from American stations, it proved quite conservative in technology and programming. It was closely aligned with powerful newspaper and church interests and was seen as a propaganda forum for the traditional elites of Quebec. It did not promote separatism or a sense of Québec nationalism.

In 1969 the province of Quebec established its own radio and television system, breaking the federal CBC monopoly. Radio-Quebec became an instrument of the provincial government, and often presented separatist viewpoints.

News
The development of radio news broadcasting in Canada, as in the United States, was delayed by bitter conflict between newspaper and radio interests. When Charles Edwards became manager of Press News in 1944, radio stations in Canada and newspapers in Canada distrusted each other in competition for advertising money, and he was a frequent peacekeeper while convincing them to co-operate for their best interests. On January 1, 1954, CP replaced Press News with a new subsidiary, Broadcast News (BN). The venture operated in co-operation with private broadcasters, and supplied news reports to privately owned radio and television stations in Canada. Edwards travelled across Canada to improve broadcast journalism, and instituted annual regional meetings to raise the standards for broadcast news directors. He was the driving force behind formation of the Radio and Television News Directors Association of Canada (RTNDA) in 1962, to seek equal access to all types of news sources at a time when government agencies banned broadcast reporters from press conferences. By the time of his retirement in 1971, Edwards felt that he brought peace between print news and broadcast news, and that they realized one complimented the other in reporting breaking news.

Talk radio

In contrast to talk radio stations in the United States, where syndicated programs tend to make up a significant part of most schedules, privately owned Canadian talk radio stations tend to be predominantly local in programming and focus. There is no Canadian content requirement for talk radio, or "spoken word," programming, unless the individual station's license expressly stipulates such a requirement; most do not. (In Canada, prospective radio stations may propose certain restrictions on their license in order to gain favour with the Canadian Radio-television and Telecommunications Commission and have an easier time obtaining a license.)

The most recent nationally syndicated, politically oriented weekday talk radio show in Canada was Adler On Line, hosted by Charles Adler and heard on eleven stations across the country. The show ended in August 2021. Until 2006, Peter Warren's Warren on the Weekend was heard Saturdays and Sundays. Both programs are or were distributed by the Corus Radio Network and, coincidentally, both hosts had hosted different morning call-in programs in the same time slot on Winnipeg, Manitoba's CJOB 680 before they became nationally syndicated (Adler's show originated from CJOB and retained its original title, while Warren was based in Victoria, British Columbia.) Prior to Adler On Line, Corus had syndicated Rutherford, hosted by conservative Dave Rutherford and originating from its Calgary station, CHQR. Rutherford is no longer syndicated nationally but continues to air in Calgary, Edmonton, and London.

Other Canadian talk radio programs which have been syndicated to different markets include:
 The George Stroumboulopoulos Show airs on Sunday nights on stations in Toronto and Montreal.
 The Home Discovery Show, a call-in home renovation program hosted by Shell Busey.
 Live Audio Wrestling; a 2-hour show focusing on mixed martial arts and professional wrestling, distributed on Fight Network Radio.
 Love and Romance, a relationship advice program hosted by Sue McGarvie.
 Prime Time Sports, a sports talk program hosted by Bob McCown. A three-hour program originating from CJCL, usually only the third hour is broadcast nationally.
 Renovations Cross Canada, a weekend program about home renovations hosted by Ren Molnar. It is the most widely distributed talk radio program in Canada.
 The Roy Green Show, a political and entertainment based show hosted by Roy Green that airs on Saturday and Sunday afternoons, primarily on the Corus Radio Network.
 The 'X' Zone, a nightly show about paranormal topics hosted by Rob McConnell. It is also syndicated throughout the United States.

The two largest talk radio networks in Canada are the publicly owned Canadian Broadcasting Corporation's English language CBC Radio One and French language Ici Radio-Canada Première. These stations typically produce their own local morning and afternoon programs and regional noon hour programs to go along with the network programming that is aired during the rest of the day. Both networks are commercial-free. CBC Radio One's flagship national talk program is the weekend Cross Country Checkup, which has been broadcast since 1965.

CFRA (580 AM) in Ottawa (formerly part of the CHUM network, which is now part of CTV) has a large and dedicated listening audience. The station is heard throughout the Ottawa valley and on the Internet. Several key programs focus on local political and world issues. 

Privately owned talk radio syndication networks in Canada are generally formed for the purposes of sharing programs across a group of stations with common ownership, although some are formed to distribute their one or two talk radio programs to a number of stations regardless of ownership. The largest of these is the Corus Radio Network. TSN Radio, the successor to the long-defunct the Team, is one of the newest national networks in Canada, with operations in three of its major markets, and has room for expansion.

See also
 History of broadcasting
 Canadian Communications Foundation
 CNR Radio, The radio network operated by Canadian National Railway 1923-33
 Canadian Broadcasting Corporation

Notes and references

Further reading
 Ali, Christopher. "A broadcast system in whose interest? Tracing the origins of broadcast localism in Canadian and Australian television policy, 1950–1963." International Communication Gazette 74.3 (2012): 277–297.
 Armstrong, Robert. Broadcasting Policy in Canada (2013)  excerpt
 Allen, Gene, and Daniel J. Robinson, eds. Communicating in Canada's Past: Essays in Media History (University of Toronto Press, 2009)
 Bird, Roger, ed. Documents of Canadian Broadcasting  (1988)
 Cabatoff, Kenneth. "Radio-Quebec: a case study of institution-building." Canadian Journal of Political Science 11.01 (1978): 125–138.
 Edwardson, Ryan. Canadian content: Culture and the quest for nationhood (U of Toronto Press, 2008)
 Filion, Michel. "Broadcasting and cultural identity: the Canadian experience." Media, Culture & Society (1996) 18#3 pp: 447–467. Online
 Gasher, Mike, and David Skinner, eds. Mass communication in Canada (Oxford University Press, 2012)
 Gasher, Mike. "Invoking public support for public broadcasting: The Aird Commission revisited." Canadian Journal of Communication  (1998) 23#2. online
 Godfrey, Donald G., and David R. Spencer. "Canadian Marconi: CFCF television from Signal Hill to the Canadian Television Network." Journal of Broadcasting & Electronic Media 44.3 (2000): 437–455. online
 Johnston, Russell. "The emergence of broadcast advertising in Canada, 1919–1932." Historical Journal of Film, Radio and Television  (1997) 17#1 pp: 29–47.
 MacLennan, Anne F. "American network broadcasting, the CBC, and Canadian radio stations during the 1930s: A content analysis." Journal of Radio Studies 12.1 (2005): 85-103. online
 Murray, Gil. Nothing on but the Radio: A Look Back at Radio in Canada and How It Changed the World (2003) online
 Nolan, Michael. "An Infant Industry: Canadian Private Radio 1919–36." Canadian Historical Review 70.4 (1989): 496–518.
 Peers, Frank W. The Politics of Canadian Broadcasting, 1920-1951 (1973)
 Peers, Frank W. Public Eye: Television and the Politics of Canadian Broadcasting, 1952-68 (1979)
 Raboy, Marc. Missed Opportunities: The Story of Canada's Broadcasting Policy (1990); a wide-ranging history of broadcasting  excerpt and text search
 Robinson, Daniel J., ed. Communication History in Canada (Oxford University Press, 2004), scholarly essays
 Roth, Loma. Something New in the Air: The Story of First Peoples Television Broadcasting in Canada (2005)
 Rutherford, Paul. When Television was Young: Primetime Canada, 1952-1967 (1990)
 Skinner, David. "Divided Loyalties: The Early Development of Canada's" Single" Broadcasting System." Journal of Radio Studies 12.1 (2005): 136-155.
 Stewart, Peggy. Radio Ladies: Canada's Women on the Air 1922-1975 (2nd ed. Magnetewan Publishing, 2012) 
 Stewart, Sandy. From Coast to Coast: A Personal History of Radio in Canada (CBC Enterprises, 1985)
 Troyer, Warner. The sound and the fury: An anecdotal history of Canadian broadcasting (1980)
 Varga, Darrell. Rain, Drizzle, Fog: Film and Television in Atlantic Canada (2009) online
 Vipond, Mary. Listening In: The First Decade of Canadian Broadcasting 1922-1932. (McGill-Queen's University Press, 1992)
 Vipond, Mary. The mass media in Canada (James Lorimer & Company, 2000)
 Vipond, Mary. "The Mass Media in Canadian History: The Empire Day Broadcast of 1939." Journal of the Canadian Historical Association/Revue de la Société historique du Canada 14.1 (2003): 1-21; The 2003 Presidential Address of the CHA
 Vipond, Mary. "The beginnings of public broadcasting in Canada: the CRBC, 1932-1936." Canadian Journal of Communication (1994) 19#2  online
 Vipond, Mary. "The continental marketplace: Authority, advertisers, and audiences in Canadian news broadcasting, 1932–1936."  Journal of Radio Studies (1999) 6#1 pp: 169–184.
 Vipond, Mary. "London listens: The popularity of radio in the depression." Ontario History 87 (1996): 47–63.
 Vipond, Mary. "One Network or Two? French-Language Programming on the Canadian Radio Broadcasting Commission, 1932–36." Canadian Historical Review 89.3 (2008): 319–343.
 Vipond, Mary. "Going Their Own Way: The relationship between the Canadian Radio Broadcasting Commission and the BBC, 1933–36." Media History 15.1 (2009): 71–83.
 Vipond, Mary. "British or American?: Canada's 'mixed' broadcasting system in the 1930s." Radio Journal: International Studies in Broadcast & Audio Media 2.2 (2004): 89-100.
 Webb, Jeffrey Allison. The voice of Newfoundland: a social history of the Broadcasting Corporation of Newfoundland, 1939-1949 (University of Toronto Press, 2008)
 Webb, Jeff A. "The Origins of Public Broadcasting: The Commission of Government and the Creation of the Broadcasting Corporation of Newfoundland." Acadiensis 24.1 (1994): 88-106. online
History of broadcasting
History of radio
History of television in Canada